Stormont may refer to:

Peerages
 Viscount of Stormont, title in the Peerage of Scotland

People
 Lord Stormont (1727–1796), British ambassador to France in the 18th century
 Robert Stormont (1872–1943), Scottish footballer, played for Preston North End, Dundee, Tottenham Hotspur and Brentford.
 Bill Stormont (1898–1925), New Zealand rugby player
Mary Stormont (1871–1962), British painter

Structures
 On the Stormont Estate:
 Stormont Castle, the seat of the Northern Ireland Executive
 Stormont House, a government building.
 Stormont (cricket ground), first-class cricket ground in the Stormont Estate
 Stormont Vail Health, a hospital center in Topeka, Kansas

Politics
 Stormont, a metonym for:
 Government of Northern Ireland (past and present)
 Northern Ireland Assembly (current)
 Northern Ireland Executive (current)
 Parliament of Northern Ireland (former)

Places

Canada 
 Stormont, Nova Scotia, a community in Guysborough County
 Stormont II, a cable ferry operating in Nova Scotia, based in the community
 Stormont, Dundas and Glengarry United Counties, a county in Ontario, Canada
 Stormont County, Ontario, one of the former counties that merged to form Stormont, Dundas and Glengarry United Counties county
 North Stormont, a township in the county
 South Stormont, a township in the county
 Stormont, Dundas and Glengarry Highlanders, a Primary Reserve infantry regiment of the Canadian Forces

United Kingdom 
 Stormont Estate, an estate in east Belfast which is home to Parliament Buildings

United States 
 Stormont, Virginia, a settlement south of Urbanna in Middlesex County, Virginia

Political entities

Canada 
 Stormont (electoral district), a federal electoral district in Ontario
 Cornwall and Stormont, a former federal electoral district from 1882 to 1904
 Glengarry and Stormont, a former federal electoral district from 1917 to 1925

United Kingdom 
 Stormont government (disambiguation)
 Parliament Buildings, commonly known as Stormont, the seat of the Northern Ireland Assembly and the Northern Ireland Executive

Other
 HMCS Stormont (K327), a River-class frigate that served in the Royal Canadian Navy from 1943 to 1945
 R.C.S.C.C. Stormont (110), a Royal Canadian Sea Cadet Corps located in Cornwall, Ontario, Canada.  Named after H.M.C.S. Stormont, a River-class frigate that served in the Royal Canadian Navy from 1943 to 1945.

 The Stormont Agreement, another name for the Belfast Agreement